Conservatory Prep Schools is a private, independent, nonsectarian school with grades 7–12 for twice exceptional (2E) student located in Davie, Florida, which is in Broward County, a suburb just west of Fort Lauderdale. The school is small by design with a capacity of 28 students. Conservatory Prep Schools is located inside the David Posnack Jewish Community Center.

References

External links 
 Conservatory Prep Schools

High schools in Broward County, Florida
Twice-Exceptional Schools
Davie, Florida